Balacra aurivilliusi is a moth of the family Erebidae. It was described by Sergius G. Kiriakoff in 1957. It is found in Tanzania.

References

Balacra
Moths described in 1957
Insects of the Democratic Republic of the Congo
Erebid moths of Africa